Annette Andre (born 24 June 1939) is an Australian actress best known for her work on British television throughout the 1960s and 1970s.

Early life and early career
The daughter of an upholsterer, Annette Andre was born in Drummoyne, Australia, as Annette Christine Andreallo. She was brought up in Sydney and educated at Brigidine College, Sydney.

She began work as a ballet dancer at the age of 4 at an academy linked to the Australian Ballet. At 15, she decided to stop ballet and pursue acting because she realised that she was not yet 16, the legal age to work in acting. Andre enrolled in a radio training school and her first radio role was in the serial radio drama called Kid Grayson Rides the Range. Her first role was in the television movie If It's a Rose. Her other Australian television performances included Slaughter of St Teresa's Day.

Later career
She went to the UK in 1963 and was cast in Emerald Soup. 

Her first film role was in This Is My Street (1964), and her other film credits include The Heroes of Telemark (1965), He Who Rides a Tiger (1965), Up Jumped a Swagman (1965) with Frank Ifield, and the Charlie Drake comedy Mister Ten Per Cent (1967). She also played Philia, a beautiful virgin concubine from the house of procurer Marcus Lycus (Phil Silvers) in the 1966 film version of the Broadway musical A Funny Thing Happened on the Way to the Forum. She played in the stage musical Vanity Fair in London's West End.

Her longest running role was as Marty Hopkirk's widow Jeannie Hopkirk in the ITC series Randall and Hopkirk (Deceased) (1969–70). She also made guest appearances in other shows such as Whiplash, The Avengers, The Saint, Adam Adamant Lives!, The Troubleshooters, The Baron and The Prisoner.

During the 1970s, Andre guest starred in episodes of The Persuaders!, The New Avengers and Return of the Saint. In the 1980s, she appeared in the soap opera Crossroads as well as returning to Australia to play Jennifer Brent in Taurus Rising and Camilla Wells in Prisoner (retitled Prisoner: Cell Block H in the US and UK).

During 1985 and 1986, she appeared onstage in London's West End in the mystery thriller The Business of Murder at the Mayfair Theatre.

Andre is now semi-retired from acting, and devotes much of her time to animal welfare issues. She spearheads the new BFF Support Group and, with her producer husband Arthur Weingarten, works closely with Virginia McKenna of the Zoo Check campaign. She made one of her rare appearances at the Mid-Atlantic Nostalgia Convention in Aberdeen, Maryland in September 2007.

Personal life
She was once linked romantically with George Best, the footballer.

In the early 1960s she turned down a proposal of marriage from Benny Hill.

She became pregnant before turning 40 and had a daughter. She elected not to reveal the identity of the father.

Memoir

In 2018, Andre published her memoir Where Have I Been All My Life, with a foreword by Sir Roger Moore and an appreciation by her Randall & Hopkirk (Deceased) co-star, Kenneth Cope.

Filmography and works

Television

Films

Music videos

Works
Where Have I Been All My Life? (2018)

References

External links
 
 Official Website

1939 births
Living people
Australian television actresses
British television actresses
Australian film actresses
British film actresses
Actresses from Sydney